Heuchera villosa, the hairy alumroot, is a small evergreen perennial native to the Eastern United States. It is found only on rock outcrops, growing on cliffs and boulders.

Heuchera villosa is sometimes grown ornamentally, with some cultivars giving having a reddish leaf coloration.

There are two described varieties, which are sometimes considered distinct species. They are:
Heuchera villosa var. macrorhiza - On calcareous substrates, primarily west of the Appalachian Mountains
Heuchera villosa var. villosa - On acidic substrates, primarily of the Appalachian Mountains and eastward

References

External links
Heuchera villosa 'Autumn Bride'

villosa
Flora of the Appalachian Mountains
Flora of the Northeastern United States
Flora of the Southeastern United States
Flora of Missouri
Garden plants of North America
Perennial plants